The  Ralph T. Webster  is a Chesapeake Bay skipjack, built in 1905 at Oriole, Maryland. She is a 47.7' long two-sail bateau, or "V"-bottomed deadrise type of centerboard sloop. She has a beam of 15.3' and a depth of 3.5', with net registered tonnage of 8 tons. She one of the 35 surviving traditional Chesapeake Bay skipjacks and a member of the last commercial sailing fleet in the United States. She is located at Tilghman, Talbot County, Maryland.

She was listed on the National Register of Historic Places in 1985.

References

External links
, including photo in 1983, at Maryland Historical Trust

Ships in Talbot County, Maryland
Skipjacks
Ships on the National Register of Historic Places in Maryland
1905 ships
National Register of Historic Places in Talbot County, Maryland